Inaccessible Bay or Baie Inaccessible is a bay in southwestern New Caledonia. It is known as "Inaccessible" because a narrow peninsula partly prevents access to the inner bay known as Saint Vincent Bay.

References

Bays of New Caledonia